Klara Apotekar (born 2 August 1997) is a Slovenian judoka. She won the gold medal in the women's 78 kg event at the 2019 European Judo Championships which were held as part of the 2019 European Games in Minsk, Belarus.

She also won the gold medal in the women's 78 kg event at the 2019 Military World Games held in Wuhan, China.

References

External links
 

Living people
1997 births
Slovenian female judoka
Judoka at the 2015 European Games
Judoka at the 2019 European Games
European Games medalists in judo
European Games gold medalists for Slovenia
Place of birth missing (living people)
20th-century Slovenian women
21st-century Slovenian women